In processed animal foods, a filler is an ingredient added to provide dietary fiber, bulk or some other non-nutritive purpose.

Products like  corncobs, feathers, soy, cottonseed hulls, peanut hulls, citrus pulp, screening, weeds, straw, and cereal by-products are often included as inexpensive fillers or low-grade fiber content.

Although most plant-derived fibers have low nutritional value to companion animals (cats and dogs), there is scientific research showing that there are some physiological benefits such as aiding in stool formation in the colon, helping to develop proper fecal consistency, overall colon health, in addition to other health benefits such as reduced blood sugar uptake.

According to critics , many commercial pet foods contain fillers that have little or no nutritional value, but are added to decrease the overall cost of the food, especially when pet food manufacturers attempt to keep their pet foods at a desired price point despite rising manufacturing, marketing, shipping, and related costs. Critics  allege that low-grade fiber fillers actually aggravate the intestinal walls instead of promoting health, and that carnivores such as cats are not able to effectively digest plant-derived fibers in their hindgut.

In rare cases, contaminated fillers have led to large-scale recalls at significant expense to the pet food companies. Two examples are aflatoxin on corn in the 2006 Diamond Dog Food Recall and melamine, which may have contaminated wheat gluten and other protein concentrates in the 2007 pet food recalls.

See also
Dog food
Meat by-product
Meat extenders

References

External links
Functions of fiber - Purina
What’s Really in Pet Food

Pet foods